Northern Ontario School of Medicine University (NOSM University) is a public medical university in the Canadian province of Ontario. It is mandated both to educate doctors and to contribute to care in Northern Ontario's urban, rural and remote communities, and has campuses in both Sudbury and Thunder Bay.

The Northern Ontario School of Medicine was originally created as a partnership between Laurentian University in Sudbury and Lakehead University in Thunder Bay, before being made a standalone university in April 2022.

The school is known for its small class size, its distributed model of education, heavy emphasis on enabling technologies, problem-based and self-directed learning, and early exposure to clinical skills.  The school describes its campus as "Northern Ontario".  This is evidenced by the close relationship between the school and various communities and First Nations throughout the region.  All students complete a month-long placement in an Aboriginal or Métis community in May of their first year.  In second year, they travel to smaller communities for two, month-long placements (one in the fall and the other in the winter).  The third year is clerkship and is spent living in one of the medium-sized communities for the entire year.  The fourth year of studies is completed in Sudbury or Thunder Bay.

In 2021, following the 2021 Laurentian University financial crisis, the provincial government announced NOSM would become an independent institution which would retain collaborative relationships with both Laurentian and Lakehead but will be funded directly by the provincial government as a standalone university. 

The school also accepts donations from the public, health care agencies, local governments, foundations and corporations. Donors can choose to support a particular area of the school's development, including social accountability, research capacity, human resource planning and innovation in education. Some of NOSM's largest donors include AstraZeneca, Barrick Gold, BMO Bank of Montreal, Bristol Myers Squibb, CTV, Eli Lilly, Fidelity Investments, HSBC Bank Canada, Hydro One Inc., Royal Bank of Canada, Scotiabank, City of Greater Sudbury, Sun Life Assurance Company of Canada, TD Bank Financial Group, City of Thunder Bay, and Wyeth Canada.

History

Before the creation of NOSM, Northern Ontario had for several years been designated as "underserviced", meaning that the region's ratio of medical professionals to the general population was not meeting the standards set by the Ministry of Health. As a result, a multifaceted plan was adopted by the province, including the creation of NOSM and the adoption of special recruitment strategies. A study of medical services in Ontario, released in August 2005, found that for the first time in many years, the region's level of medical services had improved over the previous year.

Construction on both campuses began in mid-2004, and the buildings were completed in August 2005.  NOSM accepted its charter class of 56 students in September of that same year and the school was officially opened by Premier Dalton McGuinty on 13 September 2005. The school received full accreditation from the Committee on Accreditation of Canadian Medical Schools (CACMS) and the Liaison Committee on Medical Education (LCME) in February 2009.

The fictional Boréal Medical School, the setting of the Canadian medical drama television series Hard Rock Medical, is based on the Northern Ontario School of Medicine.

Admissions

The Northern Ontario School of Medicine is one of only two medical schools in Canada outside of Quebec (along with University of Ottawa) that does not require an MCAT score to be considered for admission. Furthermore, the only academic prerequisite is a university undergraduate degree with a minimum GPA of 3.0 out of 4.0 (the mean GPA of the 2013/2014 entering class was 3.83). To help further its social accountability mandate, NOSM does take into account where candidates are from and whether they have studied or worked in Northern Ontario or other rural or remote places. For each entering class since the schools inception in 2005, approximately 90-95% were from Northern Ontario. Each year, approximately 2000 applicants compete for the 64 spots in each class (36 at the Sudbury campus and 28 at the Thunder Bay campus). Applicants request their preferred campus at the time of their interview.

Hospitals
Fully affiliated teaching hospitals:
Health Sciences North – Sudbury
Thunder Bay Regional Health Sciences Centre – Thunder Bay

Larger community teaching hospitals:
South Muskoka Memorial Hospital – Bracebridge
LaVerendrye Hospital – Fort Frances
Huntsville District Memorial Hospital – Huntsville
Sensenbrenner Hospital - Kapuskasing
Lake of the Woods District Hospital – Kenora
Temiskaming Hospital – New Liskeard
North Bay General Hospital – North Bay
West Parry Sound Health Centre – Parry Sound
Sault Area Hospital – Sault Ste. Marie
Sioux Lookout Meno Ya Win Health Centre – Sioux Lookout
Timmins and District Hospital – Timmins

The students also go to communities in the north such as Hearst, Smooth Rock Falls, Cochrane.

Health Sciences Library
The Northern Ontario School of Medicine also operates the Health Sciences Library (HSL), formerly known as the Northern Ontario Virtual Library (NOVL) to northern health-care professionals, and the Health Information Resource Centre (HIRC) to faculty, students and residents. The HSL aims to meet the traditional and expanding information needs of NOSM's learners and faculty, as well as registered health professionals throughout the region of Northern Ontario. It sponsors in-person and technologically mediated instruction on the latest health sciences resources and information technology, among other topics. The explicit aim is to further the practice of evidence-based medicine in the North, with special focus on the physicians, residents, nurses, occupational therapists, physiotherapists, and other health care professionals in northern and/or rural communities.

See also

Centre for Rural and Northern Health Research

References

External links
Northern Ontario School of Medicine
Northern Ontario School of Medicine Faculty & Staff Association & OPSEU Local 677
Northern Ontario School of Medicine Student Society
NOSM's Health Sciences Library

Educational institutions established in 2005
Medical schools in Canada
Universities and colleges in Ontario
2005 establishments in Ontario